The Archdiocese of Munich and Freising is an ecclesiastical territory or diocese of the Roman Catholic Church in Bavaria, Germany.  It is governed by the Archbishop of Munich and Freising, who administers the see from the co-cathedral in Munich, the Frauenkirche. The other, much older co-cathedral is Freising Cathedral.

The see was canonically erected in about 739 by Saint Boniface as the Diocese of Freising and later became a prince-bishopric. The diocese was dissolved in 1803 following the collapse of the Holy Roman Empire, although a titular bishop ruled until April 1, 1818, when Pope Pius VII elevated the diocese to an archdiocese with its new seat in Munich, rather than Freising.

The archdiocese is divided into forty deaneries with 758 parishes. Its suffragan bishops are the Bishop of Augsburg, the Bishop of Passau, and the Bishop of Regensburg.

The most famous archbishop was Joseph Ratzinger, who  was elected as Pope Benedict XVI.

The residence of the Archbishops of Munich and Freising is the Palais Holnstein in Munich.

See also 
Bishops of Freising and Archbishops of Munich and Freising
Prince-Bishopric of Freising

References

External links
Roman Catholic Archdiocese of Munich 
Catholic Encyclopedia article (history of the diocese up to Archbishop von Bettinger)

 
Munich
Christianity in Munich
Dioceses established in the 8th century
Bavarian Circle
739 establishments
8th-century establishments in Germany
Roman Catholic ecclesiastical provinces in Germany